Richard Chapman (8 March 1918 – 21 July 2004) was a South African cricketer. He played in one first-class match for Border in 1938/39.

See also
 List of Border representative cricketers

References

External links
 

1918 births
2004 deaths
South African cricketers
Border cricketers
Cricketers from East London, Eastern Cape